Thomas Rottensteiner (born 15 March 1963) is an Italian bobsledder. He competed at the 1988 Winter Olympics and the 1992 Winter Olympics.

References

1963 births
Living people
Italian male bobsledders
Olympic bobsledders of Italy
Bobsledders at the 1988 Winter Olympics
Bobsledders at the 1992 Winter Olympics
Sportspeople from Bolzano